Ivan Hampden Jr. (born April 1, 1958 in New York, New York) is an American jazz and R&B drummer, composer, and record producer. He was Luther Vandross’ tour and session drummer from 1987 to 2003.

Biography
Ivan Hampden grew up in the New York City neighborhood of Harlem.  He started drumming at age 8, and established himself as a working musician by age 14, playing local bars and events.  While attending college at Bronx Community College and Rutgers University, he joined the percussion ensemble at the Dance Theatre of Harlem, and began working with singer Eartha Kitt.  He went on to write and produce rap albums, and toured with Kurtis Blow on Rick James' Cold Blooded album tour in 1983.  In the mid-1980s he was introduced to songwriting/recording team Ashford & Simpson, and later joined Luther Vandross’ band as drummer and songwriter until Vandross’ death in 2005.  Throughout his career, Hampden toured and performed with a number of celebrated artists, including Roberta Flack, Chaka Khan, Jennifer Lopez, Bonnie Raitt, India Arie, Stevie Wonder, Dionne Warwick, Little Richard, Gladys Knight, Vanessa Williams, among many others.

Hampden was recognized for his participation as Arranger/Musician/Programmer on two Grammy Award-winning recordings at the 2004 Grammy Awards: Best R&B Album "Dance With My Father" performed by Luther Vandross, and Best R&B Performance By A Duo or Group with Vocals "The Closer I Get to You" performed by Beyoncé and Luther Vandross.

Today, he lives with his wife in Clayton, NC which is a suburb of Raleigh, North Carolina. He continues to play, write and produce.  He also taught recording production at North Carolina Central University. He offers private drum lessons at a local music academy and has founded a school of percussion in Clayton, NC.

Equipment
Hampden plays Yamaha drums with Vic Firth sticks and records with Samson Technologies gear.

Discography
 Treacherous Cousin Ice
 Cousin Ice (1980) Cousin Ice 
 Red Hot Rhythm & Blues (1987) Diana Ross 
 Move to This (1990) Cathy Dennis
 Love Life (1991) Akiko Yano
 That Time Again (1991) Kevin Owens
 Get Ta Know Ya Betta (1992) M & M
 Never Let Me Go (1993) Luther Vandross
 The Voice (1993) Mavis Staples
 A To a Higher Place (1994) Tramaine Hawkins
 Rendezvous (1994) Darryl Tookes
 Roberta (1995) Roberta Flack
 This Is Christmas (1995) Luther Vandross
 Gospel According to Ashford & Simpson (1996) Ashford & Simpson
 Inner City Blues (1996) Doc Powell
 Your Secret Love (1996) Luther Vandross
 Gablz (1997) Gablz
 Until (1997) Byron Miller
 Down in the Delta (1998)
 I Know (1998) Luther Vandross
 In My Path (2000) Steve Kroon
 Awesome (2001) The Temptations
 Life Changes (2001) Doc Powell
 Luther Vandross (2001) Luther Vandross
 The Ultimate Luther Vandross (2001) Luther Vandross
 It Started with a Dream (2002) Cy Coleman
 Mi Alma Latina: My Latin Soul (2002) Néstor Torres 
 Dance With My Father (2003) Luther Vandross
 Dangerously in Love (2003) Beyoncé
 Live Radio City Music Hall 2003 (2003) Luther Vandross
 The Essential Luther Vandross (2003) Luther Vandross
 Ultimate Easy Album (2005)
 Yuletide Friends (2005) Doug Gazlay
 Blues for the Tribe (2006) Baron Tyrnas
 Just Norwood (2007) Norwood Young
 Love, Luther (2007) Luther Vandross
 Luther Vandross [Madacy] (2007) Luther Vandross
 Soul Desirables (2007)
 Dangerously in Love/Live at Wembley (2008) Beyoncé
 The Music of Luther Vandross (2009) Luther Vandross
 The Classic Christmas Album (2012) Luther Vandross

References

Record producers from New York (state)
American jazz drummers
Living people
1958 births
Musicians from New York City
20th-century American drummers
American male drummers
Jazz musicians from New York (state)
20th-century American male musicians
American male jazz musicians